Kunstindustrimuseet is the native name of:

Danish Museum of Art & Design
Norwegian Museum of Decorative Arts and Design